Agonopterix atomella is a moth of the family Depressariidae. It is found in most of Europe.

The wingspan is 16–22 mm. Adults are on wing from October to May.

The larvae feed on Genista tinctoria, Genista anglica, Genista pilosa and possibly Cytisus scoparius. They feed from within a spun or rolled leaf of their host plant.

References

External links

 lepiforum.de

Agonopterix
Moths described in 1775
Moths of Europe
Taxa named by Michael Denis
Taxa named by Ignaz Schiffermüller